Trans Studio Cibubur is mixed development complex at Harjamukti, Cimanggis, Depok, West Java within Jakarta Metropolitan Area. The complex has several sections, a shopping mall, a recreation park called Trans Studio Theme Park, Trans Park (three apartment towers) and a luxury hotel called Trans Studio Hotel.

Theme park
Theme Park, which has five game zones, is endless to amaze and entertain visitors. There are 14 rides such as Zombie Wars, a haunted house that faces laser games, a former Boomerang Coaster from Knott's Berry Farm, and 2 indoor roller coasters. The park was opened on 11 July 2019, with Daan Duijm as Theme Park General Manager.

Shopping mall
There are around 200 tenants, both national and international brands. The Main tenants are Metro department store, Transmart, and Cinema XXI.

See also

Trans Studio Makassar
Trans Studio Bandung

References 

Amusement parks opened in 2019
2019 establishments in Indonesia
Buildings and structures in Depok
Amusement parks in Indonesia
Shopping malls in Indonesia
Post-independence architecture of Indonesia
CT Corp